American Woman is an American sitcom that was inspired by the childhood of actress and reality star Kyle Richards that premiered on June 7, 2018, on Paramount Network. The series was created by John Riggi and stars Alicia Silverstone, Mena Suvari, Jennifer Bartels, Makenna James, and Lia McHugh. On September 5, 2018, it was announced that the series had been cancelled after one season.

Premise
American Woman follows "Bonnie, an unconventional mother struggling to raise her two daughters after leaving her husband amid the rise of second-wave feminism in the 1970s. With the help of her two best friends, Kathleen and Diana, these three women each discover their own brand of independence in a glamorous and ever-changing world reluctant to give it."

Cast and characters

Main
 Alicia Silverstone as Bonnie Nolan
 Mena Suvari as Kathleen Callahan
 Jennifer Bartels as Diana Vaughan
 Makenna James as Becca Nolan, Bonnie and Steve's elder daughter
 Lia McHugh as Jessica Nolan, Bonnie and Steve's younger daughter

Recurring
 James Tupper as Steve Nolan, Bonnie's husband whom she throws out after catching him with another woman.
 Cheyenne Jackson as Greg, Kathleen's boyfriend who is secretly gay.
 Sam Morgan as Adam
 Diandra Lyle as Louise
 Tobias Jelinek as Mr. Bishop
 Patrick Bristow as Randall
 Jonathan Chase as Alan
 Christine Estabrook as Peggy, Diana's Mother

Guest

 Sam Anderson as Raymond Turner ("Changes and The New Normal")
 Elizabeth Bogush as Sherry ("Changes and The New Normal")
 Audrey Wasilewski as Anne ("Changes and The New Normal")
 Chosen Jacobs as William ("The Heat Wave")
 Jon Prescott as Barry ("The Agreement")
 Carter MacIntyre as Harris ("The Agreement")
 Matt Knudsen as Dr. Taylor ("Jack")
 Peta Sergeant as Hannah ("Jack")
 Cullen Douglas as Philip ("The Breakthrough")
 Bob Glouberman as Mr. Knave ("The Breakthrough")
 Matthew Glave as Cal ("Obstacles and Assets")
 Laura Regan as Carol ("I Will Survive")

Episodes

Production

Development
On June 2, 2015, it was announced that TV Land was developing a television pilot inspired by the life of The Real Housewives of Beverly Hills star Kyle Richards. The pilot was set to be produced by John Wells Productions in association with Warner Horizon Television. Executive producers included John Wells and John Riggi, who wrote the pilot script.

On November 7, 2016, it was announced that TV Land had given the production a series order for a first season consisting of 12 episodes, but a premiere date had not been set.

On March 30, 2017, it was revealed that the series had been shifted from TV Land to the newly rebranded Paramount Network. On August 14, 2017, it was announced that John Riggi had departed the series citing creative differences. Replacing him in the role of showrunner was fellow executive producer John Wells. On January 16, 2018, it was announced at the annual Television Critics Association's winter press tour that the series would premiere on June 7, 2018. On September 5, 2018, it was announced that the series had been canceled after one season.

Casting
On July 25, 2016, it was announced that Alicia Silverstone had been cast in the series lead role. On August 11, 2016, Mena Suvari joined the pilot in another lead role. Later that month, it was reported that Cheyenne Jackson and Jennifer Bartels had also joined the cast. In May 2017, Diandra Lyle was cast as Louise, a recurring role. On June 13, 2017, it was announced that Sam Morgan had joined the cast in a recurring capacity.

Filming
Principal photography for the first season of the series began in April 2017 in Los Angeles, California.

Theme Song
The show's theme song was a cover version of the 1970 The Guess Who song, American Woman. The song was performed by Kelly Clarkson.

Release

Marketing
On March 27, 2018, Paramount Network released six "first look" images from the series. On May 3, 2018, the first official trailer for the series was released. On May 17, 2018, it was announced that a cover of the song "American Woman" had been recorded by singer Kelly Clarkson. It was subsequently used in marketing material for the series.

Premiere
On April 29, 2018, the series held its official world premiere during the Series Mania Festival in Lille, France in which the first three episodes of the first season were screened. It competed against nine other international television programs in the festival's "official competition" series of shows.

On June 7, 2018, the series held a screening at the annual ATX Television Festival in Austin, Texas. A question-and-answer panel followed, featuring executive producer Josh Wells, cast members Alicia Silverstone, Mena Suvari, Jennifer Bartels, and co-executive producer Kyle Richards.

Reception

Critical response
The series has received a mixed reception from critics upon its premiere. On the review aggregation website Rotten Tomatoes, the series holds a 44% approval rating with an average rating of 5.36 out of 10 based on 18 reviews. The website's critical consensus reads, "Stereotypes and ambiguity shadow the well-meaning intentions of American Woman, though the nostalgic period setting is cute." Metacritic, which uses a weighted average, assigned the series a score of 48 out of 100 based on 10 critics, indicating "mixed or average reviews".

Ratings

Notes

References

External links
 
 

2010s American single-camera sitcoms
2018 American television series debuts
2018 American television series endings
Paramount Network original programming
English-language television shows
Television series set in the 1970s
Television shows set in Los Angeles
Television series by Warner Horizon Television